A fantasy issue is an issue of money that is not approved by a sovereign state. Since this money is usually privately made, it is not legal tender, but are usually used for political propaganda.

Overview 
Fantasy issues are often made by various separatist or similar political movements. The publishers of these notes may be private persons or corporations in the country where the issue is made.

A large amount of money of this kind was made in the SFRY. Prior to the breakup of Yugoslavia, fantasy issues appeared in every federal unit of Yugoslavia, except Vojvodina. Some of the issues, like Slovenian lipa were used as semi-official tender in parallel with the Yugoslav dinar, its first edition being 1 lipa dated to November 11 1989. Fantasy issue printed in Serbia for "Serbia and the United Serbian Republics" was the srbijanka, printed in Užice, with the same printing works printing the perper for Montenegro.

However, except for political propaganda, a fantasy issue could be made in order to show how a note might have look like had it been actually issued. An example are the issues of the FPRY made in late 40-es and early 50-es, known as the "informburo series", made in Germany by Manfred Dietl.

External links 

 (језик: хрватски) Фантазијска новчаница Федеративне Народне Републике Југославије од 50 динара 1950/05/01.

References 

Numismatics